Orang Seletar (Slitar) is a language of the Orang Laut of the south coast of the Malay Peninsula. It is very close to Malay, and may be counted as a dialect of that language.  The speaking population is unknown, but is likely in the range of a few thousand. The language is considered severely endangered by UNESCO.

References

Sources

Agglutinative languages
Languages of Malaysia
Languages of Singapore
Malay Peninsula
Peninsular Malaysia
Endangered Austronesian languages

Malayic languages